In seismology, a buried rupture earthquake, or blind earthquake, is an earthquake which does not produce a visible offset in the ground along the fault (as opposed to a surface rupture earthquake, which does). When the fault in question is a thrust fault, the earthquake is known as a blind thrust earthquake.

Ground motion

Recorded ground motions of large surface-rupture earthquakes are weaker than the ground motions from buried rupture earthquakes.

Depth

Examples are the Loma Prieta earthquake, Northridge earthquake, and the Noto Hanto earthquake.

Tsunamis
As compared to the seabed surface rupture case, uplifted water outside the fault plane in buried rupture earthquakes makes for large tsunami waves.

See also
 Aseismic creep

References

External links

Differences in ground motion and fault rupture process between the surface and buried rupture earthquakes

 
Seismology
Geological hazards